Juan Carlos Muñoz Martínez  (born 4 April 1978 in Santiago) is a Chilean former footballer who played as a defender.

Teams
  Unión San Felipe 1998–1999
  Colo-Colo 2000
  San Marcos 2001
  Unión Española 2002
  Santiago Morning 2003–2007
  Curicó Unido 2008–2012

International
Since 2017, Muñoz has played for the Chile national minifootball team alongside others former footballers such as Pablo Duque and Nelson Pinto,

Honours
 Santiago Morning
 Primera B de Chile: 2005

 Curicó Unido
 Primera B de Chile: 2008

References

External links
 
 
 

1978 births
Living people
Footballers from Santiago
Chilean footballers
Unión San Felipe footballers
Colo-Colo footballers
San Marcos de Arica footballers
Unión Española footballers
Santiago Morning footballers
Curicó Unido footballers
Primera B de Chile players
Chilean Primera División players
Association football defenders